Iurie Colesnic (born 12 August 1955) is a technical literature corrector, former publishing director, literary historian, politician and writer of the Republic of Moldova.

Biography 
Iurie Colesnic was born on 12 August 1955 in the village of Dereneu, Calarasi district, in a family of teachers. He was a Komsomol member (1969-1983). He graduated from the faculty of energy at the Technical University of Moldova in 1978. 

Iurie Colesnic has been a member of the Parliament of Moldova since 2009 and has been a member of the European Action Movement since 2010. Before Colesnic had been a member of the Party Alliance Our Moldova.

Works 
 Binecuvântare, 1989
 Buburuza, 1991
 Harap Alb (în colaborare), 1991
 Filozofii din Cubolta, 1997

Awards 
 Medalia Sfântul Daniil (2000).
 Membru - Correspondent al Academiei Internaţionale de Cadre (Kiev, 2000).
 Doctor „Honoris Cauza” al Universităţii Umaniste (Chişinău, 2000)

Bibliography 
  Tudor Ţopa.Condamnaţi la zbucium. Chişinău. Ed. Universul. 2003, pp. 224
  Petru Soltan (colectiv). Calendar Naţional.
  Tudor Ţopa. Voievozii inspiraţiei. Chişinău. 2007.

External links 
 Catalogul on-line Library of Congress
 Site-ul Parlamentului Republicii Moldova
 Alianţa Moldova Noastră

References

1955 births
Living people
Romanian people of Moldovan descent
Our Moldova Alliance politicians
Moldovan MPs 2009–2010
Save Bessarabia Union politicians

Recipients of the Order of Honour (Moldova)